"One Right Now" is a song by American rapper and singer Post Malone and Canadian singer the Weeknd. It was released through Republic Records on November 5, 2021, as the lead single from Malone's fourth studio album, Twelve Carat Toothache (2022). The artists wrote the song with Billy Walsh and producers Louis Bell, Brian Lee, and Andrew Bolooki. "One Right Now" is a synth-pop song that is set in the key of D major.

Background
On November 2, 2021, Post Malone and the Weeknd posted a 7-second snippet of the song titled "PM&TW-ORN-Update.5.nonhyped.w1.mp3" on their Instagram accounts. The post received over 150,000 likes in just an hour. While it was initially unknown what the title of the song was going to be, Malone's manager Dre London revealed that the collaboration would be titled "One Right Now". The song marks the first time the artists appeared on a song together.

Composition
Based on the teaser, the sound was described as "a synthy midtempo club track". It sees the two "harmonizing over an upbeat instrumental". Writing for Billboard, Starr Bowenbank referred to the instrumental as a "poppy synth beat". Alex Zidel of HotNewHipHop predicted that the song will "dominate the radio for the remainder of the year, and likely well into next". For the radio, The Weeknd decided to replace his lyric censors from the official clean version with newly recorded lyrics, which are "You think it's so easy messin' with my feelings" and "You probably slap all my enemies". But Post Malone preferred to leave his lyric censors as they are. They both sang "That you told me that he fucked you on" twice, separate then together, and tying to Post Malone's record label, it was also left censored.

Music video
The music video for "One Right Now", directed by Tanu Muino, was released on November 15, 2021. In the video, Malone and the Weeknd engage in a shootout with each other's teams, and concludes with them shooting each other at the same time.

Personnel 
Credits adapted from Tidal and Genius.

 Post Malone – vocals, songwriting
 The Weeknd – vocals, songwriting
 Louis Bell – songwriting, production, recording engineering, vocal production, keyboards, synthesizer, programming, drums
 Andrew Bolooki – songwriting, production, programming, synthesizer
Brian Lee – songwriting, production
 Billy Walsh – songwriting
 Manny Marroquin – mixing
 Mike Bozzi – mastering

Charts

Weekly charts

Year-end charts

Certifications

Release history

References

External links
  
  

2021 singles
2021 songs
Post Malone songs
Republic Records singles
The Weeknd songs
Songs written by Post Malone
Songs written by the Weeknd
Songs written by Louis Bell
Song recordings produced by Louis Bell
Music videos directed by Tanu Muino
Synth-pop songs